Kentucky Route 315 (KY 315) is a  state highway in the U.S. state of Kentucky. The highway travels through mostly rural areas of Breathitt County.

Route description
KY 315 begins at an intersection with KY 28 east-northwest of Morris Fork, within Breathitt County. It travels to the east-northeast, paralleling Freeman Fork, and curves to the south-southeast. It then curves back to the north-northeast and begins paralleling the Middle Fork Kentucky River, which it follows for the rest of its length. The highway curves to the east-southeast and then to the west-northwest. It then curves back to the north-northeast and passes Herald Cemetery before it intersects the western terminus of KY 1933. It curves to the west-southwest and crosses over Elsome Creek. KY 315 curves to the north-northeast and travels through Sebastians Branch. It has an eastern curve to the northwest. It curves to the north-northeast and passes Combs Cemetery before it curves to the north-northwest. The highway curves to the north-northeast and back to the north-northwest before meeting its northern terminus, an intersection with KY 30.

Major intersections

See also

References

0315
Transportation in Breathitt County, Kentucky